Hervé Lybohy (born 24 July 1983) is a professional footballer who plays as a centre-back for Championnat National 2 club Thonon Evian. Born in Ivory Coast, he plays for the Niger national team.

Club career
In May 2018, it was announced Lybohy would join Nîmes, newly promoted to Ligue 1, from Ligue 2 side Paris FC on a free transfer for the 2018–19 season. He signed a one-year contract.

In July 2019, after one season in Ligue 1, Lybohy joined Nancy in Ligue 2.

In August 2020, Lybohy moved to Championnat National side Orléans. He signed a one-year contract with the option of a second.

International career
Lybohy was born in the Ivory Coast and is of Nigerien descent. He made his debut for the Niger national team in October 2019.

Honours 
Thonon Evian

 Championnat National 3: 2021–22

References

External links
 
 
 Player Profile at SO Foot

1983 births
Living people
People from Bouaké
People with acquired Nigerien citizenship
Nigerien footballers
Ivorian footballers
Ivorian people of Nigerien descent
Association football defenders
Niger international footballers
Entente SSG players
Olympique Saint-Quentin players
Racing Club de France Football players
AFC Compiègne players
ÉFC Fréjus Saint-Raphaël players
Amiens SC players
Paris FC players
Nîmes Olympique players
AS Nancy Lorraine players
US Orléans players
Thonon Evian Grand Genève F.C. players
Ligue 1 players
Ligue 2 players
Championnat National players
Championnat National 2 players
Championnat National 3 players
Ivorian expatriate footballers
Nigerien expatriate footballers
Ivorian expatriate sportspeople in France
Nigerien expatriate sportspeople in France
Expatriate footballers in France